The 2006 Washington State Cougars football team represented Washington State University in the 2006 NCAA Division I FBS football season. The team was led by fourth-year head coach Bill Doba and played its home games on campus at Martin Stadium in Pullman, with one at Qwest Field in Seattle. The Cougars were 6–6 overall and 4–5 in the Pacific-10 Conference, tied for fifth. Ranked 25th in the AP Poll at the end of October, WSU lost its final three games.

WSU's popular mascot, "Butch T. Cougar" was named the 2006 CapitalOne Mascot of the Year.

Pre-season
Washington State did not appear in any national pre-season rankings and was predicted to finish in eighth place in the Pacific-10 Conference media poll.

Schedule

References

Washington State
Washington State Cougars football seasons
Washington State Cougars football